Forgive Me is a 1986 Soviet drama film directed by Ernest Yasan.

Plot 
A woman decides to avenge her husband by treason for treason, but as a result she became even worse.

Cast 
 Natalya Andreychenko		
 Igor Kostolevskiy
 Viktor Merezhko
 Aleksandra Yakovleva-Aasmyae
 Alisa Freyndlikh
 Vladimir Menshov		
 Aleksey Zharkov
 Tatyana Mikhaylova	
 Mariya Merezhko
 Aleksandr Kuznetsov

References

External links 
 

1986 films
1980s Russian-language films
Soviet drama films
1986 drama films